Ganim is a surname. Notable people with the surname include:

Joe Ganim (born 1959), American politician, attorney, and convicted felon
John M. Ganim (born 1945), American writer
Robert Ganim (born 1962), Papua New Guinean politician
Sara Ganim (born 1987), American journalist